Muhammad al-Burtuqali, (full name Abu Abd Allah al-Burtuqali Muhammad ibn Muhammad, Arabic : أبو عبد الله محمد البرتقالي) succeeded his father Abu Abd Allah al-Sheikh Muhammad ibn Yahya to become the second Wattasid Sultan of Morocco in 1504. He died in 1526 and was succeeded by his son Abu al-Abbas Ahmad ibn Muhammad.

Muhammad al-Burtuqali earned the nickname of Al-Bortogali after being held as a hostage for seven years by the Portuguese.

Sultan Muhammad al-Burtughali was the sultan that sent Leo Africanus and his uncle on a mission to Timbuktu. This journey gave Leo Africanus material for the Description of Africa.

References

Wattasid dynasty
Sultans of Morocco
1464 births
1526 deaths
15th-century Berber people
16th-century Berber people